The 400 metres at the Summer Olympics has been contested since the first edition of the multi-sport event. The men's 400 m has been present on the Olympic athletics programme since 1896 but nearly seventy years passed before the introduction of the women's 400 m, which has been held continuously since the 1964 Games. It is the most prestigious 400 m race at elite level. The competition format typically has two qualifying rounds leading to a final race between eight athletes.

The Olympic record for the men's race was set in 2016, and the record for the women's race was set in 1996. Wayde van Niekerk holds the men's record of 43.03 seconds, breaking world and Olympic records that had been held by Michael Johnson since 1999 and 1996 respectively. Marie-José Pérec is the women's record holder at 48.25 seconds. The men's world record has been broken several times at the Olympics: in 1912, 1932, 1960, 1968, and 2016. Irena Szewińska is the only person to break the women's world record at the competition, doing so in 1976.

Only three athletes have won the event twice: Marie-José Pérec became the first to defend the title in 1996, then Michael Johnson followed with victories in 1996 and 2000, and Shaunae Miller-Uibo successfully defended her 2016 title at Tokyo 2020. No athlete has won more than three medals. Several medalists in the event have also had success in the 200 metres at the Olympics: Johnson, Perec, Szewińska and Valerie Brisco-Hooks have all won titles at both distances. Athletes chosen for the event almost always form part of their nation's team for the 4×400 metres relay at the Olympics.

The United States is the most successful nation in the event, with 21 gold medals and 44 medals in total. The next most successful nation is Great Britain. The 1908 men's 400 metres saw the only walkover in Olympic history, as the American finalists refused to compete in the final in protest of the officiating.

Medal summary

Men

Multiple medalists

Medals by country

 The German total includes teams both competing as Germany and the United Team of Germany, but not East or West Germany.

Women

Multiple medalists

Medalists by country

Olympic record progression

Men

Women

Intercalated Games
The 1906 Intercalated Games were held in Athens and at the time were officially recognised as part of the Olympic Games series, with the intention being to hold a games in Greece in two-year intervals between the internationally-held Olympics. However, this plan never came to fruition and the International Olympic Committee (IOC) later decided not to recognise these games as part of the official Olympic series. Some sports historians continue to treat the results of these games as part of the Olympic canon.

At this event a men's 400 m was held and Paul Pilgrim, a 1904 Olympic gold medalist in the 4-mile team race, won the competition. Wyndham Halswelle, later the 1908 Olympic champion in the 400 metres on walkover, was the runner-up while Australia's Nigel Barker was the bronze medalist.

Non-canonical Olympic events
In addition to the main 1900 Olympic men's 400 metres, a handicap competition was contested seven days after the final. Twenty men entered, with Hungary's Pál Koppán, Germany's Albert Werkmüller and Dave Hall of the United States being the only non-French entrants. Koppán was the victor with a handicap of 35 m, Werkmüller was second with a handicap of 35 m, and Frenchman André Lemonnier took third with a 26 m handicap.

Two professionals-only events were also held in 1900. The 400 metres world record holder Edgar Bredin won with a time of 53.2 seconds, ahead of Legrain of France (possibly Paul Legrain) and his compatriot Jules Bouchoux. A handicap professional race was also held but the results have not been located.

A handicap 440-yard dash (402.3 m) competition was held at 1904 Summer Olympics after the 1904 Olympic men's 400 m race. An American, F. Darcy, won the race with a time of  50.8 (12-yard start). George Underwood, also of the United States, came second with no handicap and James Peck of Canada came third off a six-yard headstart.

These events are no longer considered part of the official Olympic history of the 400 metres or the athletics programme in general. Consequently, medals from these competitions have not been assigned to nations on the all-time medal tables.

Finishing times

Top ten fastest Olympic times

References
Participation and athlete data
Athletics Men's 400 metres Medalists. Sports Reference. Retrieved on 2014-02-07.
Athletics Women's 400 metres Medalists. Sports Reference. Retrieved on 2014-02-07.
Olympic record progressions
Mallon, Bill (2012). TRACK & FIELD ATHLETICS - OLYMPIC RECORD PROGRESSIONS. Track and Field News. Retrieved on 2014-02-07.
Specific

External links
IAAF 400 metres homepage
Official Olympics website
Olympic athletics records from Track & Field News

 
Olympics
400 metres